Oberea sumbawensis is a species of beetle in the family Cerambycidae. It was first described by Stephan von Breuning in 1961.

References

Beetles described in 1961
sumbawensis